High Heels is a 1921 American silent drama film directed by Lee Kohlmar and starring Gladys Walton, Frederik Vogeding and William Worthington.

Cast
 Gladys Walton as Christine Trevor
 Frederik Vogeding as 	Dr. Paul Denton 
 William Worthington as Joshua Barton
 Freeman Wood as Cortland Van Ness
 George Hackathorne as Laurie Trevor
 Charles De Briac as Daffy Trevor
 Raymond De Briac as Dilly Trevor
 Milton Markwell as Douglas Barton
 T.D. Crittenden as John Trevor 
 Robert Dunbar as Robert Graves
 Olah Norman as 	Amelia 
 Leigh Wyant as Jennie Chubb
 Hugh Saxon as Mike (butler)
 Jean De Briac as Armand

References

Bibliography
 Connelly, Robert B. The Silents: Silent Feature Films, 1910-36, Volume 40, Issue 2. December Press, 1998.
 Munden, Kenneth White. The American Film Institute Catalog of Motion Pictures Produced in the United States, Part 1. University of California Press, 1997.

External links
 

1921 films
1921 drama films
1920s English-language films
American silent feature films
Silent American drama films
Films directed by Lee Kohlmar
American black-and-white films
Universal Pictures films
1920s American films